Jerson Testoni (born 18 June 1980), known simply as Jersinho as a player, is a Brazilian professional football coach and former player who played as a left back. He is the current head coach of Altos.

Honours

Player
Imbituba
Campeonato Catarinense Divisão Especial: 2009

Manager
Brusque
Campeonato Brasileiro Série D: 2019
Copa Santa Catarina: 2019
Recopa Catarinense: 2020

References

External links
Meu Time na Rede profile 

1980 births
Living people
Sportspeople from Santa Catarina (state)
Brazilian footballers
Association football defenders
Campeonato Brasileiro Série B players
Brusque Futebol Clube players
Criciúma Esporte Clube players
Sociedade Esportiva do Gama players
Villa Nova Atlético Clube players
Associação Atlética Francana players
Botafogo Futebol Clube (SP) players
Joinville Esporte Clube players
Esporte Clube XV de Novembro (Piracicaba) players
Clube Atlético Hermann Aichinger players
Clube Náutico Marcílio Dias players
Sociedade Esportiva Recreativa e Cultural Brasil players
Brazilian football managers
Campeonato Brasileiro Série B managers
Campeonato Brasileiro Série C managers
Campeonato Brasileiro Série D managers
Brusque Futebol Clube managers
Grêmio Esportivo Brasil managers
Joinville Esporte Clube managers
Associação Atlética de Altos managers